Qeshlaq-e Qara Khanlu (also Romanized as Qeshlāq-e Qarā Khānlū; also known as Kahlī Qarah Khānlū) is a village in Qeshlaq Rural District, Abish Ahmad District, Kaleybar County, East Azerbaijan Province, Iran. At the 2006 census, its population was 31, in 9 families.

References 

Populated places in Kaleybar County